Georg Lars Wilhelm Johansson (later Brandius; 10 May 1898 – 20 April 1964) was a Swedish ice hockey and bandy player. He competed in the 1920 Summer Olympics. In 1920 he was a member of the Swedish ice hockey team which finished fourth in the Summer Olympics tournament. He played all six matches and scored three goals.

References

External links
profile

1898 births
1964 deaths
Djurgårdens IF Hockey players
Ice hockey players at the 1920 Summer Olympics
IK Göta Bandy players
IK Göta Ishockey players
Olympic ice hockey players of Sweden
Swedish bandy players